Home in Indiana is a 1944 Technicolor film directed by Henry Hathaway. The film, that stars Walter Brennan, Lon McCallister, Jeanne Crain, June Haver and Charlotte Greenwood, is based on the novel The Phantom Filly by George Agnew Chamberlain (1879–1966). The film was remade in 1957 as April Love.

The movie was nominated for an Oscar in the category Best Cinematography, Color.

Plot
Having just been sent away to live with his uncle and aunt in Indiana, teenager Sparke Thornton (Lon McCallister) has a penchant for trouble. At first, he is not satisfied with the arrangement, and continues to express his rebellious behavior. Already on his first day, he plans on running away, but crossing a harness racing track convinces him to stay in Indiana. The owner, Godaw Boole (Charles Dingle) welcomes Sparke, and introduces him to Char Bruce (Jeanne Crain), a tomboyish girl who loves to race horses. A servant (George Reed) informs him that his uncle Thunder Bolt (Walter Brennan) was once part of harness horse racing as a respected sulky driver.

Returning home, Sparke informs his family about his love for horses, but Thunder orders him to put his focus on school instead. The next day, he ignores his uncle's demands and visits the racing track, where his instinctive rapport with a stallion impresses Godaw's seductive daughter, Cri-Cri (June Haver) who is home from private boarding school. She convinces Jed Bruce (Ward Bond) to help Sparke learn how to drive. Even though he performs poorly during his first trainings, Sparke is allowed to come back due to his humility. While bonding with Char and Cri-Cri, he learns how to successfully guide a harness horse.

One night, Thunder becomes drunk and reacts violently towards Sparke. Due to his confusion, Thunder's wife Penny (Charlotte Greenwood) explains that Thunder was once partners with Boole, until Boole's harsh treatment of a mare led to a quarrel. Thunder has retired from horseback riding ever since, but still feels an urge to return. Moved by the story, Sparke becomes desperate to help out his uncle, and 'borrows' Boole's stallion to sire a foal out of Thunder's only remaining mare, and raises the money for the stud fee so that Boole will sign the registration so the foal can race. Thunder is initially furious at Sparke for interfering, but he is grateful for the outcome.

Meanwhile, Sparke's growing infatuation with Cri-Cri causes him to shift away from the track regularly. Cri-Cri feels that he is too young to take seriously, though, and she prefers the attention of Gordon Bradley (Robert Condon). Sparke is not aware that Char is madly in love with him, and instead considers her as 'one of the guys'. Meanwhile, he continues to train the horse's foal, who, during her first race, is seriously injured. Shortly after her recovery, Sparke realizes how Char feels about him and responds to her love.

Thunder has since found out that the foal is going blind, but nevertheless allows Sparke to race her. Through determination and skills, he wins the race. Returning home with the horse, who has convinced Thunder to return to his business, Sparke kisses Char.

Cast
 Walter Brennan as J. F. 'Thunder' Bolt
 Charlotte Greenwood as Penny Bolt
 Ward Bond as Jed Bruce
 Charles Dingle as Godaw Boole
 Lon McCallister as 'Sparke' Thornton
 Jeanne Crain as Charlotte 'Char' Bruce
 June Haver as Christopher 'Cri-Cri' Boole
 George H. Reed as Tuppy

Production
In November 1940, 20th Century Fox first announced its plans to shoot a film about trotting tracks, called Home in Indiana. The film would serve as a follow-up for the horse tracking films Kentucky (1938) and Maryland (1940). As with the latter film, John Payne, Walter Brennan and Fay Bainter were set to serve the lead roles, with Kenneth Macgowan as a producer and John Taintor Foote as the screenwriter. Ultimately, Foote did work on a screenplay, but his work was not included in the final print.

In March 1942, agent Charles K. Feldman planned on making a film adaptation of the Chamberlain novel, with Howard Hawks as a proposed producer. Winston Miller worked on a screenplay, but he decided to sell its rights to 20th Century Fox. Actor George Cleveland was offered a role, but commitments to another project forced him to resign. The film marked the highly promoted debuts of both Jeanne Crain and June Haver. McCallister's contribution to the film delivered him a four-year contract with Fox.

Scenes were partly filmed on the trotting tracks of Indiana, Marion, Ohio Marion County Fairgrounds and Kentucky.

See also
 List of American films of 1944

References

External links
 
 
 
 

1944 films
1940s adventure drama films
1944 romantic drama films
20th Century Fox films
American adventure drama films
American romantic drama films
1940s English-language films
Films based on American novels
Films based on romance novels
Films directed by Henry Hathaway
Films scored by Hugo Friedhofer
Films set in Indiana
Films shot in Kentucky
Films shot in Ohio
American horse racing films
1940s American films